Trudie Goodwin (born 13 November 1951) is an English actress best known for playing Sergeant June Ackland in the high-profile British television police drama The Bill from 1983 to 2007, and Georgia Sharma in the ITV soap Emmerdale, from 2011 until 2015.

Career
Goodwin had appeared in The Bill since its pilot, "Woodentop", which was part of the storyboard plays for Thames TV in 1983. However, in September 2005, Goodwin announced she would be leaving the serial drama, stating "it was time to move on". She also took a sabbatical from the show lasting several months in 2005 in order to pursue other interests which included charity work in Nigeria with CBM. Her last episodes aired in March 2007, making her not only the longest-serving member of The Bill cast in the programme's history, but also a world record-holder as the longest-serving actor to portray a police character. When the show was cancelled in 2010, she told the BBC she'd "been in a state of shock all day because [I] honestly thought [it] would go on forever, and [I was] very very sad that it isn't going to." In a later interview with Angela Griffin, she said she felt ITV bosses "messed about" with the show unnecessarily, causing its cancellation.

In addition to acting, Goodwin is also a member of The House Committee at Denville Hall, a retirement home for members of the theatrical profession.

Other television appearances
She appeared in 7 episodes of Fox in 1980. In 1987, Goodwin appeared in an episode of Have His Carcase, a Lord Peter Wimsey novel televised by the BBC, playing the part of Cherie. The same year, she also played Brenda in Series 3 Episode 1 of Three Up, Two Down.

She then appeared on a TV Goodies/Baddies episode of the game show The Weakest Link in March 2007, where she lost out to Alex Walkinshaw in the final round. From 27 July to 7 August 2007, she appeared on Countdown in Dictionary Corner with Susie Dent, hosted by Des O'Connor and Carol Vorderman. Goodwin has made two appearances on ITV daytime show Loose Women, the first being May 2009, and the other in April 2010. In 2010, she was also a guest on Bill Bailey's Birdwatching Bonanza. In July 2013, she appeared on All Star Mr & Mrs. In November 2021, she portrayed the role of Meg Clarke in an episode of the BBC soap opera Doctors.

Personal life
Goodwin's daughter Elly Jackson is lead singer of the British electropop band La Roux.

References

External links

1951 births
Living people
English television actresses
English soap opera actresses